Local elections were held in Kajiado County to elect a Governor and County Assembly on 4 March 2013. Under the new constitution, which was passed in a 2010 referendum, the 2013 general elections were the first in which Governors and members of the County Assemblies for the newly created counties were elected.

Gubernatorial election

Prospective candidates
The following are some of the candidates who have made public their intentions to run: 
 Obadiah Kimani
 Simon Ole Meeli
 Daniel Ole Nina
 Francis Sakuda
 Taraiya Ole Kores
 Moses Ole Parantai
 David Nkedianye

County Assembly
Elected representatives included:
Kajiado North - Joseph Manje 
Kajiado Central - Joseph Nkaisere
Kajiado East - Terris Tobiko
Kajiado West - Moses Sakuda
Kajiado South - Juda Katoo

References

 

2013 local elections in Kenya